The 2014 UEFA European Under-19 Championship is an international football tournament to be held in Hungary from 19 July to 31 July 2014. The 8 under-19 age group national teams involved in the tournament will be required to register a squad of 18 players. Players are eligible to play in the competition if they were born on or after 1
January 1995. Only players in these squads will be eligible to take part in the tournament.

Ages are as of the start of the tournament, 19 July 2014.

Players marked in boldface have been capped at full international level.

Group A

Head coach:  Géza Mészöly

Head coach:  Andreas Heraf

Head coach:  Hélio Sousa

Hélio Sousa named his final 18-man squad on 23 June 2014. On 23 July 2014, Romário Baldé replaced injured Nuno Santos.

Head coach:  Eli Ohana

Group B

Head coach:  Aleksandar Dimitrov

Head coach:  Marcus Sorg

Head coach:  Oleksandr Petrakov

Head coach:  Veljko Paunović

The following players were named in the squad for the 2014 UEFA European Under-19 Championship in July 2014.

Player representation

By club

By club nationality 
 
Nations in italics are not represented by their national teams in the finals.

Footnotes

References 

2014 UEFA European Under-19 Championship
UEFA European Under-19 Championship squads